The Yamaha Vision (XZ550) is a 550 cc 4 stroke 70° liquid cooled DOHC V-twin shaft-driven sport touring motorcycle produced in 1982-1983. With a range of innovative technology for its class, nimble handling, and bold styling, it was widely celebrated by the motorcycle press on its introduction as a bike ahead of its time.

However, persistent teething issues, numerous quirks, and a high price combined with identity problems - it wasn’t really a café racer, nor a sport touring bike, it was unique to itself - led to just a two-year production run.  That same uniqueness nonetheless created something of a cult of Vision fans, both in its day and since, who continue to maintain an active ongoing online community.

A smaller XZ400 model was available in some markets until at least 1987.

Overview
The XZ550 Vision was originally conceived in the late 1970s when motorcycling was at its peak, and spent three years in development, being overseen by a small group of designers and enthusiasts rather than "committee think". Several high-profile external contributors  were involved, including GK Design Associates, and reputedly Cosworth for the engine and Porsche for the final drive.   According to GK, the goal was to make “the most advanced super sport bike in terms of both styling and riding performance"  

To many enthusiasts, the XZ550 that debuted in 1982 succeeded on both fronts.  It was nimble in tight corners, yet had a comfortable upright seating position that made long rides a joy. Its throaty high-torque engine delivered both high revs for street racing and endless roll-on torque.  The 70-degree V-twin had inherent secondary balance and produced a distinctive deep, throbbing exhaust note with a high-end whine some likened to the sound of a Ferrari Testarossa.

In spite of this first year sales were poor.  The Vision was considered "the closest bike to a B.M.W. ever to come out of Japan" at the time, in reference to its touring credentials and reliability on long-distance runs, both hailed and damned as "the most European motorcycle from Japan in recent memory."

Unfortunately, producing an entirely new product from scratch is never without initial problems, and the Vision suffered from a few. An off-idle carburetion flaw left first year machines prone to initial stuttering most noticeable on full-throttle takeoff. 

The 1982 model’s lightning quick steering was highly appreciated by sporting riders, but considered too extreme for some. A single rotor front disk and rear drum brake were suitable for touring but inadequate for high-performance cornering. The shaft drive was smooth and reliable but again better suited to touring. The front suspension was too soft, and the rear, even with an adjustable shock, difficult to dial in.  

The water-cooled 4-stroke XZ550 was the first Yamaha model to feature automotive-style downdraft carburetors, with the air cleaner box mounted atop the carburetors to take advantage of a direct path for the fuel-air mixture into the cylinders - a more efficient delivery than the sidedraft carburetors common at the time. However, the height of the carburetors and their airbox required Yamaha to design a bulky tunnel into the underside of the generous 17 liter (4.5 gallon) gas tank.  The result was improved performance, and the bike’s distinctive large squared-off fuel tank.

A small “bikini” fairing and a full sport-touring fairing were both optional in 1982. The touring style full fairing became standard when the bike was repositioned as a sport tourer in 1983. 

The US 1983 model Vision fixed most of the '82's faults, with an improved carburetor eliminating the stumble, and air adjustable front forks firming up the ride and improving the roadholding. The full fairing, with adjustable hot and cold air vents, effectively shielded the rider. Minor carburetor improvements brought the engine’s unique combination of responsive high-revving clear up to its 10,000 R.P.M. redline and massive torque at any RPMs to the fore. The oversquare bore and short stroke kept piston speed low.

With its unique frame, which hung rather than cradled the engine and eliminated any tubing beneath it, both saving weight and lowering the bike’s center of gravity, the Vision's performance and roadholding were far ahead of its time. 

Unfortunately, so too was its price. The motorcycling boom of the Seventies was already receding before the XZ550 hit the showroom floors, and rival motorcycle companies offered cheaper motorcycles without either the Vision’s unusual combination of features or numerous quirks. The model was discontinued from sale in the U.S. in 1983, though it maintains cult status online.

Models 
At least thirteen major models were produced.  
 11U European model - available in unfaired, or fully varied variants (XZ550S) with many minor regional differences
 16R Australasian model -  available unfaired, with sales promotion full or bikini fairings.  Marketed as XZ550R
 11V German model  - a 50PS low power version
 11H USA/Canada model - 1982
 11J USA/Canada model - 1982
 11K USA/Canada model - 1983
 28V USA/Canada model - 1983
 28W USA/Canada model - 1983
 30R Japanese model - unfaired
 25R Japanese model - fully faired.  Marketed as XZ550D
 14R Japanese model - a 400 cc version unfaired
 ??? Japanese model - a 400 cc version with sport fairing.  Marketed as  "Air Current"
 24R Japanese model - a 400 cc version fully faired.  Marketed as XZ400D

Major differences between models included single/dual front disc brakes, different suspension details, air box, carburetor (BD34, BD36), paint schemes and branding (the XZ550 is branded as Vision in the US).  As well as the full fairing, a smaller sport fairing was available, and offered as a purchase incentive for unfaired variants.

The 400 cc version was sold from 1983 to 1987 and is almost visually identical to the 550, although it has slightly different height, width, length and weight specifications.  It was sold in full faired, half faired and naked versions.  The XZ400 was sold into non-U.S. markets (including Europe, Japan, Australia and New Zealand).  The most obvious differences other than engine capacity were slotted disc brake rotors, and a strap on the seat.  Most parts are interchangeable, although the 400 had a different bore and stroke, valve sizes making engine part swaps difficult.

Three different gear ratios exist for the European/Australasian, US and Japanese markets.  These are relatively easily swapped between models, allowing riders to select between lower-revving touring style riding, and faster acceleration.

Engine 
4-stroke 70° DOHC 552 cm³ V-Twin

 aluminum block and steel heads
 4 valves per cylinder
 liquid-cooled
 65 hp (48 kW) @ 9500 rpm
 50 N·m (37 ft·lbf) @ 8500 rpm

Specifications 
U.S. model specifications from the Yamaha Motor Company, and this model's corresponding Haynes Manual.
XZ400 Specifications from the Yamaha Motor Company.

11U model data from the Yamaha Motor Company.

References

External links
 Riders of Vision

XZ 550
Shaft drive motorcycles